North Korea competed as the Democratic People's Republic of Korea at the 1980 Summer Olympics in Moscow, USSR.

Medalists

Silver
 Se-Hong Jang — Wrestling, men's freestyle light flyweight
 Ho-Pyong Li — Wrestling, men's freestyle bantamweight
 Bong-Chol Ho — Weightlifting, men's flyweight

Bronze
 Ri Byong-uk — Boxing, men's light flyweight
 Gyong-Si Han — Weightlifting, men's flyweight

Results by event

Archery
1980 was the second time that North Korea competed in archery in the Olympics.  Two women and one man competed.

Women's Individual Competition:
 Gwang Sun-O — 2401 points (→ 5th place)
 Sok Chang-Suk — 2269 points (→ 17th place)

Men's Individual Competition:
 Kim Gye-Yong — 2331 points (→ 22nd place)

Athletics

Men's Marathon
 Chun Son-Koh
 Final — 2:20:08 (→ 27th place)

 Jong Hyong-Li
 Final — 2:21:10 (→ 29th place)

 Chang Sop-Choe
 Final — 2:22:42 (→ 33rd place)

Boxing
Men's Light Flyweight (48 kg)
 Li Byong-Uk → Bronze Medal
 First Round — Defeated Henryk Pielesiak (Poland) on points (3-2) 
 Second Round — Defeated Gilberto Sosa (Mexico) on points (3-2) 
 Quarter Finals — Defeated Dumitru Şchiopu (Romania) on points (4-1) 
 Semi Finals — Lost to Shamil Sabirov (Soviet Union) on points (0-5)

Men's Flyweight (51 kg)
 Yo Ryon-Sik
 First Round — Defeated Amala Dass (India) on points (5-0)  
 Second Round — Defeated Ramon Armando Guevara (Venezuela) on points (4-1) 
 Quarter Finals — Lost to Hugh Russell (Ireland) on points (2-3)

Men's Featherweight (57 kg)
 Gu Yong-ju
 First Round — Bye
 Second Round — Lost to Krzysztof Kosedowski (Poland) on points (0-5)

Men's Lightweight (60 kg)
 Jong Jo-Ung
 First Round — Defeated Rabani Ghulam (Afghanistan) after referee stopped contest in second round
 Second Round — Lost to Viktor Demyanenko (Soviet Union) on points (0-5)

Men's Light-Welterweight (63,5 kg)
 Ryu Bun-Hwa
 First Round — Defeated Bishnu Malakar (Nepal) after referee stopped contest in first round
 Second Round — Lost to José Aguilar (Cuba) on points (1-4)

Wrestling
Men's freestyle 48 kg
 Jang Se-hong
 First Round — Defeated Gombyn Khishigbaatar (MGL), 7:43 (won by fall)
 Second Round — Defeated Mohammed Jabbar (IRQ), 2:41 (won by fall)
 Third Round — Defeated Mohammad Aktar (AFG), 8:30 (won by fall)
 Fourth Round — Lost to Claudio Pollio (ITA), 7:12 (won by passivity)
 Fifth Round — Defeated Jan Falandys (POL), 8 - 13
 Final
 Lost to Claudio Pollio (ITA), 7:12 (won by passivity)
 Defeated Sergey Kornilayev (URS), 7:23 (won by fall) →  Silver Medal

Men's freestyle 52 kg
 Jang Dok-ryong
 First Round — Lost to Ashok Kumar (IND), 7 - 12
 Second Round — Defeated Mark Dunbar (GBR), 2 - 37
 Third Round — Defeated Mohammad Aynutdin (AFG), 6:28 (won by fall)
 Fourth Round — Lost to Nermedin Selimov (BUL), 16 - 6 → 5th place

Men's freestyle 57 kg
 Li Ho-pyong
 First Round — Defeated Cris Brown (AUS), 7:41 (won by fall)
 Second Round — Defeated Amrik Singh Gill (GBR), 5:03 (won by passivity)
 Third Round — Defeated Wiesław Kończak (POL), 9 - 5
 Fourth Round — Defeated Aurel Neagu (ROU), 3 - 10
 Fifth Round — Lost to Sergei Beloglazov (URS), 1:12 (won by fall)
 Final
 Lost to Sergei Beloglazov (URS), 1:12 (won by fall)
 Tied with Dugarsürengiin Oyuunbold (MGL), 7 - 7 →  Silver Medal

References

Official Olympic Reports
International Olympic Committee results database

Korea, North
1980
1980 in North Korean sport